The 2000–01 NBA season was the Grizzlies' sixth season in the National Basketball Association. It would also be their final year in Vancouver. For the third straight year, the Grizzlies had the second pick in the 2000 NBA draft, which they used to select Stromile Swift out of Louisiana State University. During the off-season, the team acquired Isaac Austin from the Washington Wizards, re-acquired Tony Massenburg after one season with the Houston Rockets, and signed free agent Mahmoud Abdul-Rauf. Entering their sixth season, the rumors of a move became a reality. Club owner Michael Heisley decided that it was time for the Grizzlies to move on. After five losing seasons had given the team low morale and decreasing support in the community, the team found itself in debt. Despite winning four of their first five games under new head coach Sidney Lowe, the Grizzlies lost seven straight afterwards, losing 21 of their next 25 games.

On February 19, the Grizzlies were in last place in the Midwest Division with a record of 17–36, and Heisley traveled to Memphis, Tennessee to discuss a deal between the city and the team. Other city candidates for the team's relocation included Louisville, Kentucky, Anaheim, California and New Orleans, Louisiana. The NBA would grant the team permission to move to Memphis, as the NBA determined that its time in Vancouver was a failure. At midseason, the team traded Othella Harrington to the New York Knicks in exchange for Erick Strickland. Despite a five-game winning streak in mid February, the Grizzlies would lose seven straight again, then post a nine-game losing streak in March, finishing in last place again with a record of 23 wins and 59 losses, which was their best record in Vancouver. The Grizzlies lost their final two games against the Toronto Raptors, finishing with a 4–7 record in regular season games against their Canadian rival. Shareef Abdur-Rahim led the team with 20.5 points and 9.1 rebounds per game, while Michael Dickerson finished second on the team in scoring averaging 16.3 points per game, and Mike Bibby provided with 15.9 points and 8.4 assists per game.

On April 14, the Grizzlies played their final home game at General Motors Place in Vancouver. The Grizzlies lost to the Houston Rockets, 100–95 as Steve Francis, who had been drafted by the Grizzlies but refused to play for the team, was booed throughout the game. In their final game on April 18 as the "Vancouver Grizzlies", the club played the Golden State Warriors in Oakland. The Grizzlies beat the Warriors 95–81 to avoid another 60-loss season.

The franchise moved to Memphis, and began play in the 2001–02 NBA season as the Memphis Grizzlies. Also following the season, Abdur-Rahim was traded to the Atlanta Hawks for the 3rd pick in the draft (Pau Gasol), while Bibby was traded to the Sacramento Kings, Strickland signed as a free agent with the Boston Celtics, and Abdul-Rauf and Doug West both retired.

Draft picks

Roster

Regular season

Season standings

Record vs. opponents

Game log

Player statistics

Award winners

Transactions

References

 Grizzlies on Database Basketball
 Grizzlies on Basketball Reference

Vancouver Grizzlies seasons
Van